Nadine Krause (born 25 March 1982, in Waiblingen) is a former German handballer who last played for Bayer Leverkusen as a left back. She made her debut on the German A-Team in 1999, at the age of 17. She was top scorer at the 2005 World Championships, and was voted IHF World Player of the Year 2006.<ref name=ihf>World Handball Players of the Year 2006 (Retrieved on December 11, 2007)</ref>

Achievements
German Cup:Winner: 2002
Landspokalturneringen:Winner: 2009
EHF Challenge Cup:Winner: 2005
EHF Cup Winners' Cup:Winner: 2009
World Championship:Bronze Medalist'': 2007

Awards and recognition
 IHF World Player of the Year: 2006
 German Handballer of the Year: 2005, 2006
 All-Star Left Back of the European Championship:2004
 Bundesliga Player of the Season: 2004–05, 2005–06, 2006–07
 World Championship Top Scorer: 2005
 European Championship Top Scorer: 2006
 Bundesliga Top Scorer: 2005, 2006
 Damehåndboldligaen Top Scorer: 2008

External links
 Profile on the German Handball Federation official website
 Leverkusen who's who

References

1982 births
Living people
People from Waiblingen
Sportspeople from Stuttgart (region)
German female handball players
Handball players at the 2008 Summer Olympics
Olympic handball players of Germany
Expatriate handball players
German expatriate sportspeople in Denmark